José David Díaz Ramos (born 20 May 1992) is a Salvadoran footballer who plays for C.D. Atlético Marte in the Primera División de Fútbol de El Salvador.

Career
In 2018 Díaz signed with A.D. Chalatenango after winning the 2017-18 Primera Division Apertura and Clausura titles with Alianza. Chalatengo had even put pictures of the contract signing on their social media platforms. However, Alianza issued a press release to say the player was actually signing with C.D. Águila. Díaz scored his first goal for Águila on 5 December 2018 in a 3-2 defeat against Santa Tecla. Díaz himself would join Santa Tecla for the 2020-21 Apertura league and posted a video of himself training with the help of his mother keeping for during the COVID-19 pandemic lockdown. Santa Tecla were managed for the delayed Apertura by a former coach of Díaz from his time at Alianza, the Argentine Juan Sarulyte.

International career
He made his debut for the full El Salvador team against Honduras on the 3 June 2018.

References

External links
 

Living people
1992 births
Salvadoran footballers
Association football forwards
El Salvador international footballers
Alianza F.C. footballers
C.D. Águila footballers
A.D. Isidro Metapán footballers
Jocoro F.C. players
Salvadoran Primera División players
Sportspeople from San Salvador